Evita Krievāne (born 11 June 1987) is a Latvian short track speed skater. She was born in Riga. She competed in 1000 metres and 1500 metres at the 2006 Winter Olympics in Turin.

References

External links

1987 births
Living people
Sportspeople from Riga
Latvian female speed skaters
Olympic short track speed skaters of Latvia
Short track speed skaters at the 2006 Winter Olympics
Competitors at the 2015 Winter Universiade
21st-century Latvian women